This is the discography of Scottish pop band Middle of the Road.

Albums

Studio albums

Compilation albums

Singles

References

Discographies of British artists
Pop music group discographies